Deh-e Shur or Deh Shur may refer to:
 Deh-e Shur, Kuhbanan, Kerman Province
 Deh-e Shur, Narmashir, Kerman Province
 Deh-e Shur, South Khorasan